Adriopea pallidata is a species of beetle in the family Cerambycidae, and the only species in the genus Adriopea. It was described by Broun in 1910.

References

Parmenini
Beetles described in 1910